Salah Niazi ((Ṣalāḥ Nīyāzī); born 1935) is an Iraqi poet and translator from the city of Nasiriyah currently living in the United Kingdom.

Biography
Salah Niazi has lived in the United Kingdom since 1964, when he was exiled from Iraq. He has made important contributions to post-World War II contemporary war poetry and has participated in the literary life of the Iraqi migrant community in the UK. His poems have been translated into several languages, including into English, Spanish, and French. He worked at the BBC Arabic Service for almost twenty years and also received a doctorate from the University of London. 

Salah Niazi is married to Samira al-Mani (Arabic:  سميرة المانع, Samīra al-Māniʿ) who is also a writer from Iraq. Together, they founded a literary journal in 1985, al-Ightirab al-adabi (Arabic: الإغتراب الأدبي, al-ʾiġtirāb al-ʾadabī, Literature in Exile), which highlighted the work of the Iraqi exile community. 

Niazi has also translated notable works of the English language, such as James Joyce's Ulysses, which he did so in part to distract himself from the horrors of the Iran-Iraq war of the 1980s. Other translations into Arabic include William Shakespeare's plays, Macbeth, King Lear, and Hamlet.

Literary Oeuvre

Poetry 
 2015: Dizza Castle - Selected Poems, translated by several hands, edited by David Andrews

Novels/Novellas 
 2013:  غصن مطعّم في شجرة غريبة (Ġuṣn muṭaʿʿam fī šajara ġarība), an autobiography

Short Story Collections

Translations (English to Arabic) 

 The Old Capital, by Yasunari Kawabata
 Ulysses, by James Joyce
 The Winslow Boy, by Terence Rattigan
 Hamlet, by William Shakespeare 
 Macbeth, by William Shakespeare

Translations (Arabic to English)

Articles

English translations

Awards and honours

References 

Living people
Iraqi writers
20th-century Iraqi poets
Iraqi translators
1935 births
English–Arabic translators
People from Nasiriyah
British people of Iraqi descent
21st-century Iraqi poets